The Complete Peel Sessions is a collection of songs by The Wedding Present recorded with John Peel.  The album was released in 2007 on Castle Music.

External links
The Complete Peel Sessions at Pitchfork Media

2007 compilation albums
The Wedding Present albums
2007 live albums
Peel Sessions recordings